Mount Vernon Township may refer to:

 Mount Vernon Township, Faulkner County, Arkansas, in Faulkner County, Arkansas
 Mount Vernon Township, Jefferson County, Illinois
 Mount Vernon Township, Cerro Gordo County, Iowa
 Mount Vernon Township, Black Hawk County, Iowa
 Mount Vernon Township, Winona County, Minnesota
 Mount Vernon Township, Lawrence County, Missouri
 Mount Vernon Township, Davison County, South Dakota, in Davison County, South Dakota

Township name disambiguation pages